Mikaela Eleni Fotiadi (greek: Μικαέλα Ελένη Φωτιάδη, born 26 December 1993) is a Greek–Dutch model. In 2015, she was crowned Star Hellas and represented her country at the Miss Universe pageant in Las Vegas. In 2016, she was crowned Miss Europe World in Lebanon.

Early life
Fotiadi was born on December 26, 1993, in Haarlem, Netherlands to Giorgos Fotiadis and Cathy Burger. Her father is Greek and her mother is Dutch. She has three siblings: Daniella (b. 1991), Alexandra (b. 1997) and Mercurios (b. 2004). In 2002, She moved with her family to Crete, Greece.

Career
At the age of 18, Fotiadi took part at "Star Hellas - Miss Hellas" beauty pageant but was unplaced. In 2013, she won the title of Miss Worldwide Tourism and began to work as a model.
 
In 2015, Fotiadi took part again at "Star Hellas - Miss Hellas" pageant and she won the first title. After that, represented Greece at the Miss Universe beauty pageant in Las Vegas. Also, she did a campaign for the Turkish clothing line "25th Hour" by Seda Oturan.

In 2016, Fotiadi was crowned Miss Europe in Lebanon and after that, she began a collaboration with Lebanese company "Savanah Cosmetics". Also, she took part for first time on Greek fashion show "MadWalk - The Fashion Music Project" with the designer Celia Kritharioti. In 2017, Fotiadi took part for second time on "MadWalk - The Fashion Music Project" in a collaboration with clothing line "MED Luxurious".

Fotiadi walked many times in catwalk of Athens Exclusive (Greek Fashion Week) for designers such as Nella Ioannou, Panos Apergis, Chris Stratikopoulos, Kathy Heyndels, Makis Tselios etc.

In 2018, Fotiadi was a contestant on Greece's Next Top Model, where she was eliminated in the twenty-third episode. She was placed 9th overall. On 12 January 2019 Fotiadi walked in catwalk for "Atelier Zolotas". In 2020, Fotiadi was a contestant on My Style Rocks.

Personal life
From 2013 to 2019, Fotiadi had been in a relationship with model Yiannis Borbokis, and on 21 June 2017 she gave birth to their first child, a son, Christos-Michael Borbokis.

References

External links
Official Star Hellas website

Living people
Greek beauty pageant winners
Miss Universe 2015 contestants
1994 births
Models from Athens
Greek people of Dutch descent
Greek female models